Margaret Fitzgerald may refer to:
 Margaret Fitzgerald, Countess of Ormond (died 1542), daughter of Gerald FitzGerald, 8th Earl of Kildare and Alison FitzEustace
 Margaret Fitzgerald (supercentarian) (1896–2009), Canadian supercentenarian
 A main character in the film Million Dollar Baby, played by Hilary Swank